Jiří Svoboda (born April 25th, 1961 in Ostrava, Czechoslovakia) is a Czech architect, designer, and university teacher. He specializes in research of architectural history of Zlín.

References

Czech architects
1961 births
Living people
People from Ostrava
Architecture academics